Andrea Nencini (born 25 December 1948) is a retired Italian volleyball player. He was part of the Italian teams that won the 1970 Summer Universiade and finished second at the 1975 Mediterranean Games and eighth at the 1976 Summer Olympics.

References

1948 births
Living people
People from Sesto Fiorentino
Olympic volleyball players of Italy
Volleyball players at the 1976 Summer Olympics
Italian men's volleyball players
Mediterranean Games silver medalists for Italy
Competitors at the 1975 Mediterranean Games
Mediterranean Games medalists in volleyball
Universiade medalists in volleyball
Universiade gold medalists for Italy
Medalists at the 1970 Summer Universiade
Sportspeople from the Metropolitan City of Florence